Oxford is a town in Granville County, North Carolina, United States, with a population of 8,628 as of the 2020 census. It is the county seat of Granville County.

History
The town's history dates to 1761, when local legislator Samuel Benton built a plantation home and called it "Oxford." The legislature ordered the area around his plantation to be the seat of Granville County. The town was not incorporated until 1816.

The first Masonic orphanage for children in the United States was built in Oxford. It was originally established as St. John's College in 1858. The college ceased operations shortly after opening, however. In 1872 the community decided that the property should be repurposed to educate disadvantaged populations. In December 1873 the first residents were admitted to the Oxford Orphans Asylum, which is today known as the "Masonic Home for Children at Oxford."

In 1851 James H. Horner established Horner Military School, which enrolled many young men from New York, Pennsylvania, Virginia, South Carolina and other states. Many of the students went on to become leaders in the United States government, such as James Crawford Biggs, Solicitor General under President Franklin D. Roosevelt at the inception of the New Deal. After the barracks were destroyed by a fire in 1913, the school relocated to Charlotte, North Carolina.

The Oxford Female College was established in 1850 by North Carolina Baptists. After suffering financial difficulties, the college was sold and became a private educational institution renamed "Oxford Female Seminary." In 1880 F. P. Hobgood took over leadership of the school, and it gained popularity under his leadership. The school closed in 1925, following Hobgood's death the previous year.

In 1883 the state legislature established the Colored Orphan Asylum in Oxford. Henry Plummer Cheatham, a former U.S. congressman (1889-1893), was appointed as superintendent in the early 1900s and led the institution for 28 years.

In 1970, Henry Marrow was shot and killed in Oxford. The killing resulted in a racial protest. The events were chronicled by Timothy Tyson in the book Blood Done Sign My Name (2004) and a 2010 movie with the same name.

A Confederate statue was erected in 1909 by the Granville Grays United Daughters of the Confederacy at a cost of $3000.00 and valued in 2009 at $1,327,791.62. The monument was erected in the courthouse square facing away from the courthouse. The monument, a memorial to the Confederate veterans of Granville County that served in the Civil War in the Granville Grays Company D, 12th Regiment, was dedicated October 30, 1909. The statue had not arrived in time but the ceremony continued and the statue was placed at a later date.

Following the 1970 Oxford protests, the city moved the monument from the courthouse square to a site in front of the Richard H. Thornton Library. Since 2009, some activists had suggested moving it to an historic graveyard located down the street. In June 2020 the statue was removed and is currently in storage. 

The Central Orphanage, Granville County Courthouse, Joseph B. Littlejohn House, Locust Lawn, Oxford Historic District, Paschall-Daniel House, Archibald Taylor Plantation House, and Thorndale are listed on the National Register of Historic Places.

Geography
Interstate 85 crosses the southeastern edge of the town, with access from Exits 202, 204, and 206; I-85 leads southwest  to Durham and northeast  to Petersburg, Virginia. U.S. Route 15 passes through the center of Oxford as Lewis Street, Hillsboro Street, and College Street, leading southwest  to Creedmoor and north  to Clarksville, Virginia. U.S. Route 158 bypasses Oxford on the northern side, leading east  to Henderson and west  to Roxboro.

Oxford contains three voting precincts in Granville County: Credle, East Oxford, and South Oxford.

Demographics

2020 census

As of the 2020 United States census, there were 8,628 people, 3,454 households, and 2,235 families residing in the city.

2010 census
As of the census of 2010, there were 8,461 people in 3,410 households in the town. The population density was 1,880.2 people per square mile (729.4/km). There were 3,771 housing units at an average density of 838.0 per square mile (325.1/km). The racial composition of the town was: 55.6% Black or African American, 38.6% White, 1.1% Asian American, 0.4% Native American, 2.5% Other, and 1.8% two or more races.  4.8% of the population identified as Hispanic or Latino American

There were 3,410 households, out of which 26.3% had children under the age of 18 living with them. The average household size was 2.48. In the town, the age distribution of the population was spread out, with 23.4% under the age of 18, 8.8% from 18 to 24, 10.6% from 25 to 34, 18.1% from 35 to 49, 19.7% from 50 to 64, and 19.4% who were 65 years of age or older. For every 100 females, there were 79.4 males.

The median income for a household in the town was $32,050 and the mean income was $48,293. The median and mean income for a family was $49,787 and $62,355, respectively. The per capita income for the town was $20,729. About 16.9% of families were at or below the poverty line, including 38.6% of those under age 18 and 19.3% of those age 65 or over. Of the total town population, 20.6% were at or below the poverty line.

Government

The mayor of Oxford is Jackie Sergent.

As of January 2022,  the City of Oxford Commissioners are: 

 Quon Bridges
 Ron Bullock
 Bryan Cohn
 Patricia Fields (Mayor Pro Tem)
 Seth Lumpkins
 John Tovey
 Teresa Gilreath

Economy
Oxford is home to Revlon's largest manufacturing facility, as well as its IT/IS department. CertainTeed has a roofing supplies plant in the city, Bailey Farms Inc Chile Pepper Grower & Distributor, Macra Lace Textiles, Shalag nonwoven hygienic fabrics, Gate Precast Concrete, Ideal Zipper, AWNC Toyota transmission manufacturing, Masonic Home for Children, and Biofuels Center of North Carolina are located in Oxford.

Notable people
 Tiny Broadwick, parachutist pioneer
 Benjamin Chavis, civil rights activist
 Hannah Cifers, mixed martial artist 
 Henry Plummer Cheatham, US congressman (1889-1893) representing North Carolina's 2nd district; principal of the Colored Orphan Asylum in Oxford for 28 years
 Franklin Wills Hancock Jr., Democratic member of the U.S. House of Representatives
 Isaiah Hicks, basketball player, was on the 2017 NCAA championship team at North Carolina
 Junius Horner, Episcopal bishop
 Martha Hunt, model
 Ed Meadows, NFL defensive end, All-American at Duke
 Lee Meadows, pitcher for 1925 World Series champion Pittsburgh Pirates
 Richard Moore, North Carolina State Treasurer
 Marshall L. Shepard, Pennsylvania politician and clergyman
 Thad Stem, Jr., poet, author, newspaper columnist
 Abraham Watkins Venable (1799 – 1876), politician
 James E. Webb, administrator of NASA who guided the US lunar landing thrust
 Ayesha Rascoe, American journalist for NPR

Schools
 C. G. Credle Elementary School
 J.F. Webb High School
 J.F. Webb High School of Health and Life Sciences
 Joe Toler-Oak Hill Elementary School
 Mary Potter Middle School
 Northern Granville Middle School
 West Oxford Elementary School
 Oxford Preparatory School

References

External links
 
 Oxford Historic Preservation Commission
 Granville County Historical Society Museums
 George C. Shaw Museum
  Central Children's Home - Oxford images
 Masonic Children's Home - Oxford images
 1882 Map of Oxford, NC
 Slideshows and Oxford History

Populated places established in 1761
Cities in North Carolina
Cities in Granville County, North Carolina
County seats in North Carolina